Vattakudi is a village in the Pattukkottai taluk of Thanjavur district, Tamil Nadu, India.

Demographics 

As per the 2020 census, Vattakudi north had a total population of 2716 with 1703 males and 1013 females. The sex ratio was 1222. The literacy rate was 71.67%.

About Vattakudi north
Vattakudi north is located near Pattukkottai, Thanjavur district. The people are generally well educated. Agriculture is the main occupation in this village

Temples
 
The temples located here are SRI KALYANA SUBURAMANIYA SWAMI TEMPLE,Veeranar and naachiyathal temple, Minnadiyar temple, Sri Balathandayudhabani temple, Ganapathi temple etc.

Famous persons
Music Director Thasi born at vattakudi north.
Iranniyan who struggled for independence of India in 1947,born at vattakudi north.

Famous Fellow Kaveendar Palanivel, ADMK Youth wing secretary born in 24-08-2001 at vattakudi.

References 

 

Villages in Thanjavur district